Septuagint may refer to:

 Septuagint, a translation of the Hebrew Bible and Deuterocanonical books into Koine Greek. 
 Septuagint manuscripts, the Library of Alexandria translation of Jewish scriptures into Koine Greek as it exists in various manuscript versions.

See also
 Septuaginta zagulajevi, a genus of moth in the family Pterophoridae.
 Septuagintillion refers to names of large numbers.
 Septuagesima, the name for the ninth Sunday before Easter, the third before Ash Wednesday.